The Cabinet of Ministers in Suriname is appointed by the President of Suriname.

List

References 

Politics of Suriname